The Argentina national under-16 and under-17 basketball team is a national basketball team of Argentina, governed by the Confederación Argentina de Basquetbol. It represents the country in international under-16 and under-17 (under age 16 and under age 17) basketball competitions.

World Cup record

See also
Argentina national basketball team
Argentina national under-19 basketball team
Argentina women's national under-17 basketball team

References

External links

Archived records of Argentina team participations

Under
Men's national under-17 basketball teams